Stenaelurillus iubatus is  a species of jumping spider in the genus Stenaelurillus that in endemic to Nigeria. It was first described in 2011 by Wanda Wesołowska and Anthony Russell-Smith. The male has two stripes of white scales on the carapace and the female has a heart-shaped white spot on the abdomen. The spider has a distinctive mane-like long hairs on its black eye field, which is recalled in the species name that is derived from the Latin for mane. It can be distinguished from other species in the genus by the ribbon-shaped embolus on the male and highly sclerotized epigyne with its narrow pocket and widely separated copulatory openings on the female.

Taxonomy
Stenaelurillus iubatus was first described by Wanda Wesołowska and Anthony Russell-Smith in 2011. It is one of over 500 species identified by the Polish arachnologist Wesołowska. The genus Stenaelurillus was first raised by Eugène Simon in 1885. The name relates to the genus name Aelurillus, which itself derives from the Greek word for cat, with the addition of a Greek stem meaning narrow. In 2017, it was grouped with nine other genera of jumping spiders under the name Aelurillines. It has been placed in the subtribe Aelurillina in the tribe Aelurillini in the clade Saltafresia. The species name derives from the Latin for mane and recalls the hairs behind the male's eye field.

Description
The spider is medium sized. It has a dark brown oval carapace that is covered in dark scales, except for two stripes of white scales on the thorax, and edged with white streaks. The shape of the abdomen differs from other species of Stenaelurillus, which are typically oblong. The eye field is black, with distinctive dense fawn hairs. The clypeus is black. The spinnerets are brown and the pedipalps are blackish brown, covered in dense black hairs. It can be distinguished from other members of the genus by its ribbon-shaped embolus and presence of a hairy mane around the eye field.

The female is very similar to Stenaelurillus pilosus, with one of the original examples later being recognised as a paratype of this species. The carapace is slightly pear-shaped and has indistinct light streaks. The eye field has long brown bristles. The abdomen is grey-brown with a light heart-shaped spot on the end. The epigyne is highly sclerotized and has a narrow pocket and widely separated copulatory openings. The epigyne distinguishes it from other spiders.

Distribution
The species is endemic to Nigeria. The holotype for the species was found near Ibadan, Oyo State in 1973. It has been found in fallow bush and on the verge of a road.

References

Citations

Bibliography

Endemic fauna of Nigeria
Fauna of Nigeria
Salticidae
Spiders described in 2011
Spiders of Africa
Taxa named by Wanda Wesołowska